The Booby Hatch (a.k.a. The Liberation Of Cherry Jankowski) is a 1976 American sex comedy film written and co-directed by John A. Russo. The film's co-directors both worked on Night of the Living Dead and the film features a cameo by David Emge who appeared in Dawn of the Dead.

Release
The film was released on DVD by Synapse Films in 2009.

Reception
Slant Magazine gave the film one and a half stars and criticized the "ineptitude" of the filmmaking.

References

External links 

Films based on American novels
American independent films
Films set in Pittsburgh
Films shot in Pennsylvania
1976 comedy films
1976 films
American sex comedy films
1970s American films
1970s sex comedy films
1976 independent films